Maronite Catholic Eparchy of Cairo of the Maronites (in Latin: Eparchy Cahirensis Maronitarum) is a seat of the Maronite Church suffragan of the Patriarchate of Antioch of the Maronites. It is currently ruled by eparch Georges Chihane.

Territory and statistics
The eparchy extends to all the faithful of the Maronites in Egypt, Sudan, and South Sudan. Its eparchial seat is the city of Cairo, where the cathedral of St. Joseph is located.

The eparchy at the end of 2013 had 5,000 members and is divided into seven parishes.

History
The patriarchal vicariate to Maronites in Egypt was built in 1904. It was raised to the dignity of eparchy on 22 June 1946 with the Papal bull Inter praecipuas of Pope Pius XII.

Bishops
 Pietro Dib (July 30, 1946 - November 4, 1965 deceased)
 Joseph Merhi, CML (August 24, 1972 - June 5, 1989 withdrawn)
 Joseph Dergham (June 5, 1989 - September 18, 2005 withdrawn)
 François Eid, OMM (September 24, 2005 - June 16, 2012 appointed patriarchal procurator to the Holy See)
 Georges Chihane, from 16 June 2012

List of Churches 
List of Maronite Churches in Egypt

 Saint Joseph Cathedral in Cairo

 Saint Maron Parish - Heliopolis
 George's Parish - Shubra
 Saint Therese Parish - Alexandria
 Saint Therese Church - Ismailia
 Saint Therese Church - Port Said

See also 

 List of Catholic dioceses in Egypt
 List of cathedrals in Egypt

Sources
 Annuario Pontificio, Libreria Editrice Vaticana, Città del Vaticano, 2003,

References

External links

 http://www.catholic-hierarchy.org/diocese/dlcma.html
 http://www.gcatholic.org/dioceses/diocese/cair1.htm

Christianity in Cairo
Catholic Church in South Sudan
Eastern Catholic dioceses in Africa
Eastern Catholicism in Egypt
Eastern Christianity in Libya
Eastern Catholicism in Sudan
Lebanese diaspora in Africa
Maronite Catholic eparchies